The 1953 Five Nations Championship was the twenty-fourth series of the rugby union Five Nations Championship. Including the previous incarnations as the Home Nations and Five Nations, this was the fifty-ninth series of the northern hemisphere rugby union championship. Ten matches were played between 10 January and 28 March. It was contested by England, France, Ireland, Scotland and Wales. England won its 14th title.

Participants
The teams involved were:

Table

Results

External links

The official RBS Six Nations Site

Six Nations Championship seasons
Five Nations
Five Nations 
Five Nations
Five Nations
Five Nations
Five Nations
Five Nations
Five Nations
Five Nations